M. rubecula may refer to:
 Motacilla rubecula, a small insectivorous passerine bird species
 Myiagra rubecula, a passerine bird species

See also
 Rubecula